Yorktown High School is a public high school in Yorktown Heights, New York that serves students in grades 9–12. The school offers academic electives, sports, and student news and literary publications. The school is accredited by the New York State Board of Regents and Middle States Association of Colleges and Secondary Schools. As of Sept. 2018, the Superintendent is Dr. Ron Hattar. The Principal is Joseph DeGennaro and he has been at the post since the Fall of 2008.

History
The school received local and national media attention after its principal was abruptly fired in February 2008. All of the students walked out to protest the firing and many parents expressed concerns. Despite the opposition, the firing was upheld.

Notable alumni 

 Roy Colsey, professional lacrosse player
 Susan Faludi, American feminist, journalist, and author
 Andrew Kavovit, Class of 1989, actor (As the World Turns)
 Jeff Modesitt, former NFL player
 Alexandria Ocasio-Cortez, American politician
 Mandy Rose, professional wrestler for WWE
 Rachel Lindsay, American cartoonist and author
 Dan Scavino, American political advisor
 Russ Swan, former NFL player

References

External links 
 Yorktown Central School District

Public high schools in Westchester County, New York